is a railway station located in the city of Izunokuni, Shizuoka Prefecture, Japan operated by the private railroad company Izuhakone Railway. It is located in the former town of Nirayama.

Lines
Izu-Nagaoka Station is served by the Sunzu Line, and is located 11.4 kilometers from the starting point of the line at Mishima Station.

Station layout
The station has one side platform and one island platform connected to the station building by a footbridge. However, only the island platform serving tracks 2 and 3 is in normal use for passenger traffic, and is used for bidirectional traffic for both normal and express services. The station building has automatic ticket machines, a staffed service counter and shops.

Platforms

History 
The line was extended onwards to Ōhito on July 17, 1899. The station was given its present name on May 25, 1919. The station building was rebuilt in 1986.

Passenger statistics
In fiscal 2017, the station was used by an average of 2444 passengers daily (boarding passengers only).

Surrounding area
Izu-Nagaoka onsen
former Izu-Nagaoka Town Hall

See also
 List of Railway Stations in Japan

References

External links

 Official home page

Railway stations in Japan opened in 1898
Railway stations in Shizuoka Prefecture
Izuhakone Sunzu Line
Izunokuni